Tzuke is a surname. Notable people with the surname include:

Bailey Tzuke (born 1987), British singer-songwriter
Judie Tzuke (born 1956), English singer-songwriter